The 1985 San Marino motorcycle Grand Prix was the final race of the 1985 Grand Prix motorcycle racing season. It took place on 30 August–1 September 1985 at the Circuito Internazionale Santa Monica.

Classification

500 cc

References

San Marino and Rimini Riviera motorcycle Grand Prix
San Marino
San Marino Motorcycle Grand Prix
San Marino Motorcycle Grand Prix